Tony Clement (born Morriston, 8 February 1967) is a former Welsh international rugby union player. He played as a fullback and was awarded 37 caps for Wales, scoring 7 tries and a drop goal. He played at the 1991 Rugby World Cup finals and at the 1995 Rugby World Cup finals. Tony represented the British & Irish lions in 1989, touring to Australia. In 1993 he toured New Zealand with the British Lions, scoring £ tries and a drop goal for the Lions. At the time played club rugby for Swansea RFC.

Tony Clement spent his entire playing career with his club, Swansea. He then went on to become head coach of the club, along with Keith Colclough.

Tony was formerly Wales under 20s team manager.

External links
Profile of the Player

1967 births
Living people
Barbarian F.C. players
British & Irish Lions rugby union players from Wales
Rugby union fullbacks
Rugby union players from Morriston
Swansea RFC players
Wales international rugby union players